John Roger Whittle was an English footballer who played at right-back for Port Vale just before World War II.

Career
Whittle joined Port Vale in May 1938 and made his debut in a 1–1 draw with Swindon Town at the County Ground on 4 February 1939. He played in the 1–0 defeat to Torquay United seven days later at The Old Recreation Ground, and also was in the side for two further Third Division South games in April 1939. During the war he guested for Leeds United, Bath City and Watford, before returning to Burslem in September 1945. However he only played two games in the war leagues in September 1945 before he departed in the summer of 1946.

Career statistics
Source:

References

Year of birth missing
Year of death missing
Footballers from Liverpool
English footballers
Association football fullbacks
Port Vale F.C. players
Leeds United F.C. wartime guest players
Watford F.C. wartime guest players
English Football League players